Sakae Sushi (Kanji: 栄寿司) is a restaurant chain based in Singapore serving Japanese cuisine, and is the flagship brand of Sakae Holdings Ltd. Aimed at the low to mid-level pricing market, it offers sushi, sashimi, teppanyaki, yakimono, nabemono, tempura, agemono, ramen, udon, soba and donburi served either à la carte or via a sushi conveyor belt.

History
The chain has 5 outlets. Its first outlet was opened in Raffles Place in September 1997, and is currently the largest kaiten-zushi Japanese restaurant chain in the country. It also has 17 outlets in Malaysia, one in Thailand, six in China, three in the Philippines and four in Indonesia. It also offers a delivery service in both Singapore and Malaysia.

Sakae Sushi's founder is Singaporean Douglas Foo, who has said that he would one day like to expand operations into North Korea, because of the potential for effective monopoly power in the region.

See also
 List of Japanese restaurants
 List of sushi restaurants

References

External links
Official site (Singapore)
Official site (Malaysia)

Restaurants established in 1997
1997 establishments in Singapore
Fast-food chains of Singapore
Restaurants in Singapore
Restaurant chains in Singapore
Japanese restaurants
Sushi restaurants
Singaporean brands